Djiboutian art is the artistic culture of the Somali, Afar both historical and contemporary. A lot of Djibouti's original art is passed on and preserved orally, mainly through song. The oldest evidence of art in Balho are pre-historic rock paintings. Many examples of Islamic, Ottoman, and French influences can also be noted in the local buildings, which contain plaster work, carefully constructed motifs and calligraphy. There is no tangible art present, except the beautifully preserved buildings demonstrating Islamic, French and Ottoman architectural elements.

References

Djiboutian culture